Black Legend was a collaboration between Italian DJs and producers Enrico Ferrari and Ciro Sasso; plus British vocalist Elroy "Spoonface" Powell.

Black Legend's "You See the Trouble with Me" reached number-one on the UK Singles Chart in June 2000. The chart-topping version featured a karaoke re-recording of the original Barry White vocal by Powell. A follow-up single entitled "Somebody", billed as Shortie vs. Black Legend, failed to achieve chart success.

Discography

Singles

References

Italian dance music groups
Italian house music groups